Lisa Raymond and Rennae Stubbs were the defending champions but they competed with different partners that year, Raymond with Samantha Stosur and Stubbs with Nathalie Dechy.

Dechy and Stubbs lost in the first round to Liezel Huber and Martina Navratilova.

Raymond and Stosur lost in the semifinals to Huber and Navratilova.

Svetlana Kuznetsova and Amélie Mauresmo won in the final 6–2, 6–4 against Huber and Navratilova.

Seeds
Champion seeds are indicated in bold text while text in italics indicates the round in which those seeds were eliminated.

 Lisa Raymond /  Samantha Stosur (semifinals)
 Daniela Hantuchová /  Ai Sugiyama (quarterfinals)
 Anna-Lena Grönefeld /  Meghann Shaughnessy (first round)
 Liezel Huber /  Martina Navratilova (final)

Draw

External links
2006 Hastings Direct International Championships Doubles draw

Doubles
Forest Hills Tennis Classic